Daniel Thomas Murphy (born April 1, 1985) is an American former professional baseball infielder who played 12 seasons in Major League Baseball (MLB) for the New York Mets, Washington Nationals, Chicago Cubs, and Colorado Rockies. While primarily a second baseman, he also played first base, third base, and left field. Murphy was an MLB All-Star in 2014, 2016, and 2017.

En route to leading the New York Mets to their fifth World Series appearance in franchise history, he won the National League Championship Series MVP Award in 2015, setting a record for consecutive postseason games with a home run with six.

Early life
Daniel Murphy was born in Jacksonville, Florida, to Tom and Sharon Murphy. Murphy has a younger brother, Jonathan, and a sister, Tricia. Murphy began playing baseball at the age of five years and played his high school ball at Englewood High School in Jacksonville. Jacksonville University was the only four-year school to offer Murphy a scholarship.

College baseball
Murphy attended Jacksonville University, where he played college baseball for the Dolphins under head coach Terry Alexander. In college, he was regarded as a strong hitter, but a below-average fielder. As a freshman, when asked to introduce himself and name what position he played (implying his defensive position), Murphy instead gave his preferred position in the batting order: "I'm Daniel Murphy from Jacksonville and I hit third." He mostly played third base but was also slotted into right field to minimize the defensive liability. As a junior in 2006, Murphy posted a .398 batting average en route to being named the A-Sun Baseball Player of the Year.

Professional career

New York Mets
The New York Mets selected Murphy in the 13th round, with the 394th overall pick, of the 2006 MLB draft. The first two months of Murphy's professional career were spent rehabilitating a knee injury he suffered late in his college career. He spent the entire 2007 season with the High-A St. Lucie Mets of the Florida State League.

2008–11
Murphy began the 2008 season with the Double-A Binghamton Mets. On August 2, a day after being promoted to the Triple-A New Orleans Zephyrs, the Mets left-handed reserve outfielder Marlon Anderson was placed on the disabled list, and Murphy was called up to the majors. In his first major league at bat, against three-time All-Star Roy Oswalt, Murphy hit a single. Later in the same game, he made a difficult catch against the left field wall, throwing out Hunter Pence at second base for a double play to end the inning. As of August 9, 2008, Murphy was only the fifth Mets rookie to record 10 hits in his first 20 at bats. Murphy hit his first home run in the bottom of the sixth inning against the Florida Marlins at Shea Stadium on August 9. He finished the season batting .313, with two home runs and 17 runs batted in (RBIs).

Although he is a natural third baseman, Murphy began to play left field in 2008, and continued in 2009, due to the presence of David Wright on the Mets. Murphy had a hard time transitioning to left field. In May, Carlos Delgado underwent hip surgery and Murphy moved to first base. Murphy led the Mets in home runs, with 12. This tied 1977 as the season with the fewest home runs to lead a Mets team in franchise history.

On March 30, 2010, Murphy hurt his knee in a spring training game against the St. Louis Cardinals in a rundown between third base and home plate. On June 2, while playing second base for the Buffalo Bisons, the Mets' Triple-A affiliate, he suffered a "high-grade" MCL tear while trying to turn a double play. Although surgery was not needed, he was expected to miss 4–6 months. 

The following year, Murphy suffered a season-ending injury to his MCL on August 7, 2011 after a collision with the Atlanta Braves' José Constanza.
At the time of his season-ending injury, Murphy had the 3rd highest batting average in the National League. However, Murphy did not have enough at-bats to qualify as a league leader at the conclusion of the 2011 season.

2012–2014
Murphy began the 2012 season as the Mets' starting second baseman after recovering from his MCL injury from 2011. On April 9, he hit a walk-off single against the Nationals to give the Mets a 4–3 victory, and their first 4–0 start since 2007. After going 352 at-bats since his last home run on July 16, 2011, Murphy hit two against the Cubs on June 27. Murphy was named as the Mets nominee for the 2012 MLBPAA Heart & Hustle Award, which was ultimately won by Mike Trout of the Angels.

Murphy had a strained muscle on his right side during spring training. He returned to training on February 20, said he didn't have a timetable for his return to regular workouts. For the period ending September 1, Murphy was named the National League Player of the Week after accumulating five doubles, seven runs and thirteen hits. Murphy had a strong 2013, establishing himself as one of the best offensive 2nd basemen in the league. Murphy played in 161 games and batted .286. Murphy finished 2nd in the National League with 188 hits. Murphy also contributed 13 home runs and 78 RBIs. Murphy led the National League in stolen base success rate, swiping 23/26 bases, an 88.4 percent success rate. Following the season, he was again nominated for the MLBPAA Heart & Hustle Award, this time losing out to Boston Red Sox second baseman Dustin Pedroia. Murphy was named to his first Major League Baseball All-Star Game in 2014 as the backup to starter Chase Utley.  His roster position was announced on July 6, at which time he had 105 hits (second in the National League) and a .295 batting average.

2015

In 2015, after an injury to David Wright, Murphy was moved to third base on June 4. He spent the regular season splitting his time between first base, second base, and third base. Murphy hit the 225th and 226th doubles of his career in a game against the Atlanta Braves on September 22, giving him the second-most doubles in Mets franchise history, ahead of Ed Kranepool and behind David Wright. In the deciding fifth game of the 2015 National League Division Series (NLDS) against the Los Angeles Dodgers, Murphy had three hits, including the game-winning home run in the sixth inning, to lead the Mets to a 3-2 win.  He had also scored the Mets' second run of the game, after singling, going first-to-third on a walk, and scoring on a sacrifice foul-out. For the entire NLDS, Murphy had five RBI and seven hits in 21 at-bats, three of them being home runs and one of them being a double, giving him a 1.143 OPS.

Over the course of the NLDS and 2015 National League Championship Series (NLCS), Murphy became the first person in major league history to hit a home run in six consecutive postseason games, beating a record set by Carlos Beltrán, and became the second person, after Lou Gehrig, to have a hit, a run, and an RBI in seven consecutive postseason games. He also broke a Mets franchise record for most home runs in the postseason, previously held by Mike Piazza. He hit .529 with four home runs, a double and six RBI and was named the 2015 NLCS MVP.

During the eighth inning of game 4 of the 2015 World Series against the Kansas City Royals, Murphy made a key fielding error which increased Kansas City's chances of winning the game by 32 percentage points. The Royals went on to win 5-3. Murphy tallied two errors and only three hits in his 20 at-bats as the Mets lost the Series in five games.

During the off-season, the Mets offered Murphy a one-year, $15.8 million qualifying offer. On November 13, 2015, Murphy rejected the offer, thus becoming a free agent. This ensured the Mets a compensation draft pick if he signed with another team.

Washington Nationals (2016–2018)
On December 24, 2015, Murphy agreed to a three-year, $37.5 million contract with the Washington Nationals. The New York Mets gained a draft pick from the Nationals since Murphy turned down New York's one-year, $15.8 million qualifying offer. The Mets got a compensation pick between the first and second rounds.

On May 2, 2016, Murphy recorded his 1,000th career hit in a game against the Kansas City Royals.
On June 5, 2016, Murphy was selected to his second all-star game. He was nearly voted a starter by fans, losing to the Cubs' Ben Zobrist by just 88 votes. In 142 games, Murphy finished the year with a .347 batting average, 25 home runs, and 104 RBI. He also led the NL in doubles (47), slugging percentage (.595), and on-base-plus-slugging (OPS) percentage (.985). He won his first Silver Slugger Award, being named the best offensive National League second baseman of 2016. He finished second in the NL MVP voting behind Kris Bryant. On September 20, 2016, Murphy was the last batter that Marlins pitcher  José Fernández faced in the major leagues; Fernández died in a boating accident five days later.

The following year, Murphy was voted in as a starter in his third all-star game. In 144 games, Murphy finished the year with a .322 batting average, 23 home runs, and 93 RBI, despite battling a knee injury for at least part of the season. His batting average was best among National League second basemen and second-best in the National League overall, and his .928 on-base-plus-slugging (OPS) percentage was the best by a National League second basemen and more than 130 points higher than the next-best OPS among them. He won his second consecutive Silver Slugger Award, being named the best offensive National League second baseman of 2017.

Murphy underwent microfracture surgery on his knee in the off-season, and began the 2018 season on the 60-day disabled list. On June 12, 2018, he was activated off of the disabled list.

Chicago Cubs (2018)
On August 21, 2018, Murphy was traded to the Chicago Cubs in exchange for minor league infielder Andruw Monasterio and either a player to be named later or cash.

Colorado Rockies (2019–2020)

On December 21, 2018, Murphy signed a two-year, $24-million contract with the Colorado Rockies  with a $12 million option for the 2021 season. In 2019 he batted .279/.328/.452.

On October 28, 2020, Murphy was one of 147 players who were declared a free agent at the conclusion of the 2020 Major League Baseball season. There was no official word which side declined to exercise his option for the following season. He instead received a $6 million buyout, and ended his Rockies career with a batting line of .269/.316/.426.

On January 29, 2021, Murphy announced his retirement at the age of 35.

Personal life
Daniel's younger brother, Jonathan, also played college baseball at Jacksonville University as an outfielder and was selected in the 19th round (580th overall) of the 2012 Major League Baseball draft by the Minnesota Twins. In August 2014, the Twins organization released Jonathan from the Cedar Rapids Kernels.

In 2011, Murphy appeared with fellow Major Leaguers Shane Victorino and Clay Buchholz on a special Veterans Day episode of the ABC series Extreme Makeover: Home Edition.

Murphy married his longtime girlfriend, Victoria "Tori" Ahern, on December 1, 2012, in Florida. The couple have three children; two sons and a daughter. 

When Daniel Murphy took a three-day leave of absence from the team to attend the birth of his child, something guaranteed by the MLB collective bargaining agreement, he received heavy criticism from New York City radio commentators Boomer Esiason and Craig Carton on their show for doing so. While they were roundly criticized for their comments—including a statement by Mets manager Terry Collins where he told them to "look in the mirror"—Murphy himself said only that he was aware of the comments.

On June 9, 2014, Murphy was invited to speak at the Working Families Summit at the White House.

In March 2015, Major League Ambassador for Inclusion, Billy Bean, visited the Mets spring training clubhouse. Murphy, a devout Christian, made controversial comments when he remarked on Bean, who is gay: "I do disagree with the fact that Billy is a homosexual. That doesn't mean I can't still invest in him and get to know him" and "You can still accept them but I do disagree with the lifestyle, 100%." The next day Bean responded in an article on MLB.com, "I appreciate that Daniel spoke his truth. I really do. I was visiting his team, and a reporter asked his opinion about me. He was brave to share his feelings, and it made me want to work harder and be a better example that someday might allow him to view things from my perspective, if only for just a moment." Murphy announced the same day he would no longer talk to the media about his religious beliefs, and said he would "stick to baseball."

References

External links

1985 births
Living people
Águilas Cibaeñas players
American expatriate baseball players in the Dominican Republic
Baseball players from Jacksonville, Florida
Binghamton Mets players
Brooklyn Cyclones players
Buffalo Bisons (minor league) players
Chicago Cubs players
Colorado Rockies players
Gulf Coast Mets players
Jacksonville Dolphins baseball players
Kingsport Mets players
Major League Baseball first basemen
Major League Baseball left fielders
Major League Baseball second basemen
Major League Baseball third basemen
National League All-Stars
National League Championship Series MVPs
New Orleans Zephyrs players
New York Mets players
Peoria Saguaros players
Silver Slugger Award winners
St. Lucie Mets players
Waikiki Beach Boys players
Washington Nationals players
World Baseball Classic players of the United States
2017 World Baseball Classic players